Amarilli Nizza (born January 4, 1971) is an Italian operatic soprano.

Early life and education
Nizza was born in Milan. She is a great-great-granddaughter of the soprano Medea Figner. (Figner was also the poetical inspiration of Pyotr Ilyich Tchaikovsky, who composed for her and her husband, the tenor Nikolai Figner, The Queen of Spades (opera) (1890) and Iolanta (1892)).

From childhood she studied piano and singing with her grandmother Claudia Biadi. In 1993 she won the competition Mattia Battistini and debuted in Madama Butterfly (as Cio-Cio-San) by Puccini at Teatro Flavio Vespasiano in Rieti. After a series of earlyexperiences, in 2001 Amarilli Nizza started to be internationally in the spotlight by performing mainly the great Italian opera repertoire.

Career
She was Giorgetta in Il tabarro at Teatro dell'Opera in Rome in 2002, in 2003 Francesca in Francesca da Rimini, in 2005 Thaïs (opera), in 2006 Micaela in Carmen (opera), in 2008 Madama Butterfly at Terme di Caracalla  and Amica, and in 2010 Margherita / Elena in Mefistofele.

At Teatro Verdi (Trieste) in 2003 she was Nedda in Pagliacci conducted by Massimo de Bernart, in 2004  Anna in I cavalieri di Ekebù, in 2005 Anna Glavari in The merry widow with Vittorio Grigolo, in 2007 Suor Angelica and Manon Lescaut conducted by Daniel Oren. In 2014 again Madama Butterfly conducted by Donato Renzetti.

In 2003 she performed  Tosca  for Arena di Verona foundation in Cipro. At Arena di Verona she debuted as Aida in 2005  and performed this role until  2014 (in 2014 directed by La Fura dels Baus); in 2006 she was Nedda in Pagliacci by Leoncavallo. In 2012  Micaela in Carmen by Bizet and Liù in Turandot by Puccini. In  2013 she returned to perform the role of Abigaille in Nabucco by Verdi and of Aida. In 2014 she sang  her first Cio Cio San at Arena di Verona (Madama Butterfly). At Teatro Filarmonico in Verona she debuted in  2004 as the main role in Tosca by Puccini; then  The merry widow (operetta) by Lehár in 2005, Manon Lescaut in 2011 and Nedda in Pagliacci in 2012; Odabella in Attila (opera) by Verdi in 2013.

In 2007 she debuted as Tosca with José Cura at Wiener Staatsoper.

During the Festival Puccini in Torre del Lago in 2010 she debuted Madama Butterfly and came back to this festival in 2014 to perform Suor Angelica and Giorgetta in Il Tabarro.

For the first time she sang in Naples in 2006, thus performing Desdemona in Otello at Teatro San Carlo; again in 2006 she performed  Madama Butterfly at Arena Flegrea, where she returned in 2009 for the same role.

At Teatro Regio in Turin in 2008 she performed Fidelia in Edgar, aired by RAI Italian television, and in 2014 sang Cio-Cio-San in Madama Butterfly, which was aired live HD at cinemas around the world, in specific over eighty cinemas in Italy and on Rai Radio 3. This opera was aired afterwards on  Rai 5 TV with an audience of 97.000 people. In January 2015 she returned in Turin at Teatro Regio to perform the main character in Suor Angelica.

In 2011 she debuted at Royal Opera House in London as Cio-Cio-San in Madama Butterfly, then Leonora in Il trovatore at Teatro Massimo Vittorio Emanuele in Palermo, Lady Macbeth in Macbeth (opera) at Lipsia Opera, and Nedda in Pagliacci with Alberto Gazale, conducted by Daniel Oren at Teatro Verdi (Salerno).

In  2012 she performed Mimì in La bohème at Opéra de Nice. In 2013 Amica at Opéra de Monte-Carlo, Madama Butterfly at Fenice in Venice, where she returned for the same role in 2014.

In Spain she sang in Mallorca (Tosca, 2005), in Oviedo Un ballo in maschera at Teatro Campoamor in 2009, and at Oviedo Opera Madama Butterfly in 2014, in Siviglia (Madama Butterfly in 2012), in Pamplona (Madama Butterfly, 2012 ) and at Gran Teatre del Liceu in Barcelona (Madama Butterfly in 2013 and Il Tabarro in a concert version, 2014).

In Germany she made her debut in 2003 as Aida at Deutsche Oper in Berlin, where she returned in 2005 for Pagliacci and in 2007 for Suor Angelica. Moreover, she debuted at Staatsoper in Hamburg (2011, Macbeth; 2013, I due Foscari), at Lipsia Opera (2011 and 2012, Macbeth; 2013 and 2014, Nabucco; Tosca in 2014; "Nabucco" in 2016) and at Semperoper in Dresden (2012, Tosca; 2013 and 2016 Macbeth).

In China she performed in 2006 in a concert in Beijing in collaboration with Teatro San Carlo, in 2013 in a concert Verdi/Wagner in Macao directed by Lu Jia, and in 2015 in Andrea Chenier at Beijing National Centre for the Performing Arts directed by Lu Jia.

In 2015 she performed in Suor Angelica at Teatro Regio di Torino, in Nabucco and Tosca at Oper Leipzig, Macbeth at De Nationale Opera Amsterdam, Andrea Chenier directed by Lu Jia with Alberto Gazale in Pechino (China), in Aida with Gregory Kunde at Arena di Verona directed by Andrea Battistoni in a production by Franco Zeffirelli, in Macbeth at Teatro Comunale di Bologna and in Manon Lescaut at Hamburgische Staatsoper.

In 2016 she performed in Macbeth at Semperoper Dresden, in Suor Angelica at Opera di Firenze, in Nabucco at Opera di Leipzig, in Madama Butterfly at  Teatro Municipale di Piacenza and at Teatro Comunale di Modena.

Partial discography
She recorded several  CDs for different labels and recorded many DVDs. She firstly recorded a CD including all Mazurkas by Chopin with the pianist Enrica Ciccarelli, copied by Pauline Viardot, 
Puccini: Opera Arias – Amarilli Nizza/Ostrava Dvorak Theatre Orchestra/Gianluca Martinenghi/Julian Reynolds/Arturo Toscanini Foundation Orchestra, 2008 Dynamic
Verdi: Duetti verdiani – Roberto Frontali/Amarilli Nizza/Ostrava Dvorak Theatre Orchestra/Gianluca Martinenghi, 2011 Dynamic
Verdi: Aida – Daniel Oren (conductor), Orlin Anastassov, Marianne Cornetti, Amarilli Nizza, Walter Fraccaro, Marco Spotti, Ambrogio Maestri. Arena di Verona 2009
DVD
Puccini, Edgar – José Cura (Edgar), Amarilli Nizza (Fidelia), Julia Gertseva (Tigrana), Marco Vratogna (Frank), conductor Yoram David and direction by Lorenzo Mariani – DVD e Blu-ray Disc 2008 – ArtHaus Musik/Rai Trade
Verdi, I Vespri Siciliani – Vladimir Stoyanov (Guido di Monforte), Cesare Lana (Il Sire di Béthume), Lorenzo Muzzi (Il Conte Vaudemont), Renzo Zulian (Arrigo), Orlin Anastasov (Giovanni da Procida), Amarilli Nizza (La duchessa Elena), Stefano Ranzani (conductor), Orchestra della Fondazione Arturo Toscanini – DVD Dynamic Record
Puccini, Il Trittico – Amarilli Nizza, Alberto Mastromarino, Annamaria Chiuri, Rubens Pelizzari, Alessandro Cosentino, Cristina Pezzoli, Julian Reynolds (conductor) – CD DVD e Blu-ray Disc – Rai Trade
Mozart, Don Giovanni – Renato Bruson (Don Giovanni), Nikolay Bikov (Il commendatore), Anna Laura Longo (Donna Anna), Luca Canonici (Don Ottavio), Amarilli Nizza (Donna Elvira), Stefano de Peppo (Leporello), Orchestra Filarmonica di Roma, Michael Halasz (conductor), Enrico Castiglione (director) – DVD Pan Dream Edition
Riccardo Zandonai, I cavalieri di Ekebù – Victor Afanasenko (Giosta Berling), Mariana Pentcheva (La comandante), Amarilli Nizza (Anna), Carlo Striuli (Sintram), Luca Grassi (Cristian), Eldar Aliev (Samzelius), Federico Tiezzi (director) – DVD BNG Edition

Amarilli Nizza worked with conductors such as: Maurizio Rinaldi, Daniel Oren, Eve Queler, Bruno Bartoletti, Alain Lombard, Philippe Auguin, Markus Letonja, Patrick Fourniller, Renato Palumbo, Maurizio Arena, Maurizio Benini, Gianluigi Gelmetti, Alain Guingal, Donato Renzetti, Giuliano Carella, Gunter Nehueld, Piegiorgio Morandi, Massimo de Bernart, Stefano Ranzani, Kery-Linn Wilson, Steven Mercurio, Nikša Bareza, Ralph Weikart, Yoram David, Massimiliano Stefanelli, Viekoslav Sutey, Romano Gandolfi, George Pehlivanian, Paolo Carignani, Julian Kovachev, Carlo Palleschi, Roberto Rizzi-Brignoli, Paolo Arrivabeni, Fabrizio Maria Carminati, Antonino Fogliani.
And directors like: Franco Zeffirelli, PierLuigi Pizzi, Saverio Marconi, Vivien Hewitt Stefano Vizioli, Stephen Lawless, Jean Luis Grinda, Gianfranco De Bosio, Walter Pagliaro, Hugo De Ana, Gilbert Delfo, Alberto Fassini, Roberto De Simone, Massimo Ranieri, Federico Tiezzi, Nicolas Joel, Gino Landi, Cristina Pezzoli, Isabelle Wagner, Giorgio Gallione, Ivan Stefanutti, Dieter Kaegi, Leo de Bernardinis, Beppe De Tomasi, Pierfrancesco Maestrini, Renata Scotto, Antonello Madau Diaz, David Poutney, Goetzhe Friedrich, Pier Alli, Lorenzo Mariani, Renzo Giacchieri, Franca Valeri, Giovanni Scandella, Giulio Ciabatti, Francesco Micheli.

Honours and awards

Orazio Tosi Award for Tosca – Regio di Parma (2002)
Giulietta Award for Aida – Arena di Verona (2006)
Gianni Poggi International award for il Trittico – Piacenza (2007)
Special Award Città di Anguillara (2007)
International Award Tiberini D'Oro 2008 (San Lorenzo in Campo)
Matassa d'Oro Award 2009 (Carpi)
Giovanni Zenatello Award 2009 (Verona)
Civetta d'oro Award 2010 to her career (Vizzini)
Marcella Pobbe Award 2010 (Vicenza)
42º Puccini Award (December 22, 2013): Career Achievement award, which is yearly bestowed by Fondazione Festival Pucciniano (Viareggio)

References

External links

1971 births
Living people
Italian operatic sopranos
Singers from Milan
21st-century Italian singers
21st-century Italian women singers